Stuart Hamm (born February 8, 1960) is an American bass guitar player, known for his session and live work with numerous artists as well as for his unconventional playing style and solo recordings.

Career
Born in New Orleans, Hamm spent his childhood and youth in Champaign, Illinois, where he studied bass and piano, played in the stage band at Champaign Central High School, and was selected to the Illinois All-State Band. Hamm graduated from Hanover High in Hanover, New Hampshire in 1978, while living in Norwich, Vermont. Following high school, he attended the Berklee College of Music in Boston, where he met guitarist Steve Vai and, through him, met Joe Satriani. Hamm played bass on Vai's debut solo album, Flex-Able, which was released in 1984.

Hamm has performed and recorded with Steve Vai, Frank Gambale, Joe Satriani and many other well-respected guitarists. It was his playing live on tour with Satriani that brought Hamm's skills to national attention. Subsequent recordings with Satriani and other rock/fusion artists, along with the release of his own solo recordings, solidified his reputation as a bassist and performer.

Style
Hamm's first solo album, Radio Free Albemuth, inspired by the Philip K. Dick novel of the same name, was released in 1988. On it, Hamm demonstrated his abilities on a number of original compositions spanning a variety of genres including fusion, country, and classical. On solo pieces like "Country Music (A Night in Hell)," he demonstrates his slapping and two-handed tapping proficiency as well as the ability to make the bass imitate the sounds of a wide range of instruments; the piece has since become a popular live piece. On the same album, he performs an arrangement of Beethoven's "Moonlight Sonata".

Early in his career, Hamm was associated with Philip Kubicki's Factor basses. Later, Fender musical instruments produced two signature model electric basses designed and endorsed by Hamm himself, the first artist model bass ever made by Fender:  the "Urge Bass" and the "Urge II Bass" upgrade with a D-Drop Tuner. Features include a sleek alder body, a graphite reinforced maple neck with a 2-octave rosewood fingerboard, a pair of dual-coil Ceramic Noiseless Jazz Bass single-coils (neck/bridge), a custom-wound split-coil Precision Bass humbucking pickup (middle) and a 3-band active EQ with 18V power supply. These basses were discontinued in 2010. Hamm then had his own Washburn signature models since 2011, the AB40SH acoustic bass and the Hammer, featuring EMG pickups, Hipshot bridge/tuners and a 3-band active EQ - followed by a fretless version (SHBH3FLTSS) and the Stuart Hamm Electric Bass series, introduced on January 20, 2012. In 2014, he moved to Warwick basses and started work on a signature model based on his Washburn with the Warwick Streamer model shape.

Hamm's slapping, popping and two-handed tapping techniques are demonstrated on his solo recordings, as well as in his instructional videos, Slap, Pop & Tap For The Bass and Deeper Inside the Bass. A popular part of his live performance often includes a two-handed tapping arrangement of Vince Guaraldi's "Linus and Lucy" (from the animated television special A Charlie Brown Christmas).

Since March 2011, Hamm has performed with "The Deadlies," houseband for KOFY-TV's Creepy KOFY Movie Time.

In July 2011, Hamm accepted the position of Director of Bass Programs at Musician's Institute in Hollywood, California. For the past two decades, Hamm has also toured as one of the world's premier bass clinicians.

Discography

Solo albums
 Radio Free Albemuth (1988)
 Kings of Sleep (1989)
 The Urge (1991)
 Outbound (2000)
 Live Stu X 2 (2007)
 Just Outside of Normal (2010)
 The Book Of Lies (2015)
 The Diary of Patrick Xavier (2018)

With Frank Gambale
 The Great Explorers (1993)

With Frank Gambale and Steve Smith
 Show Me What You Can Do (1998)
 The Light Beyond (2000)
 GHS3 (2002)

With Joe Satriani
 Dreaming #11 (1988) -- Ice 9, Memories and Hordes of Locusts
 Flying in a Blue Dream (1989) -- Strange and The Bells of Lal (Part Two)
 Time Machine (1993) -- Disc One: Time Machine, The Mighty Turtle Head and All Alone. Disc Two: Circles, Lords of Karma and Echo
 Crystal Planet (1998) -- All Tracks except Time and Z.Z.'s Song
 Live in San Francisco (2001)
 Live In Paris: I Just Wanna Rock (2010)

With Joe Satriani, Eric Johnson, and Steve Vai
 G3 Live in Concert (1997) -- Tracks 1-3

With Steve Vai
 Flex-Able (1984)
 Passion and Warfare (1990)
 Fire Garden (1996) -- Track 3

With other artists
 Richie Kotzen, Richie Kotzen (1989)
 Michael Schenker Group, Arachnophobiac (2003)
 Working Man, a Rush tribute album, tracks #7, #10, #11 (1996)
 Yngwie Malmsteen, Ronnie James Dio, for Not The Same Old Song and Dance, an Aerosmith tribute album, track #6, "Dream On" (1999)
 George Lynch, Gregg Bissonette, and Vince Neil, for Bat Head Soup, an Ozzy Osbourne tribute album, track #9, "Paranoid" (2006)
 Caifanes (band) on the El nervio del volcán (album) on track #8 Quisiera Ser Alcohol.
 Adrian Legg, Mrs. Crowe's Blue Waltz (1992)
 Bill Lonero, "Slather" (2004)
 David Stockden, "Reflections of Themes" (2009)
 Thomas Tomsen, "Sunflickers" (2010)
 Matthias Arp, "Endorphin Overdose" (2010) - Track 1+10
 Marco Iacobini, "The Sky There'll Always Be" (2013)
 Gretchen Menn, "Oleo Strut" (2011)

Instructional videos
 Slap, Pop & Tap for the Bass (1987)
 "Deeper Inside the Bass" (1993)
 "Bass Basics" (2008) 
 "Fretboard Fitness" (2010)

References

External links
 
 Interview with Stu Hamm..., 10/01/2009
 Interview with Stuart Hamm at AltGuitarBass.com

1960 births
Living people
Musicians from New Orleans
American blues guitarists
American male bass guitarists
American rock guitarists
Michael Schenker Group members
20th-century bass guitarists
21st-century American bass guitarists
Guitarists from Louisiana
20th-century American bass guitarists
20th-century American male musicians
21st-century American male musicians
Favored Nations artists